Balsamic vinegar of Modena is a variety of balsamic vinegar and a PGI condiment from Italy. It is produced according to various recipes. The PGI production regulations leave plenty of leeway, allowing the use of grape must (even if it is not from the provinces of Modena and Reggio Emilia) in percentages between 20 and 90% and wine vinegar between 10 and 80%. The use of caramel is allowed, up to 2%. Reading the tag can provide useful information on the ingredients used and the processing methods. Withdrawal and refilling, as used in making Traditional Balsamic Vinegar, are not used; the ingredients, once mixed, must be kept in wood containers for a duration of at least 60 days. If the product is kept there for 3 years or more it is labeled "invecchiato" (aged).
The Balsamic vinegar of Modena gained the PGI label on 3 July 2009. The requirements for the much more expensive PDO Traditional Balsamic Vinegar are different and more restrictive; it must contain only grape must and be aged for at least 12 years.

Granting of PGI label 
Upon submission of the application by Italy, Germany and Greece raised the objection that the protection of the expression "balsamic vinegar" would have strongly damaged their national production, that has been legalized for five years. They emphasized that the words "vinegar" and "balsamic", as generic terms, were not amenable to protection. They made known that they would have voted for the PGI label only in exchange for recognition of their right to use words "balsamic vinegar" by Italy. Also, France opposed, especially for the fact that the denomination "Balsamic Vinegar of Modena" wouldn't have had a reputation distinct from that of the '"Traditional Balsamic Vinegar of Modena", which would mislead the consumer.

After three years of disputes, on 3 July 2009, the European Commission put the balsamic vinegar of Modena in the register of protected geographical indications, with unanimous vote – apart from the "technical" abstention of France". 

Right after the protection of the EU in 2009, Greece tried to use a technical norm of the EU – unaware of the geographical protection procedures –  to obtain recognition of the definition of "greek balsamic vinegar", confirming the attractiveness of a market which at the time was worth around 400 million Euros per year.

Consortia 
In 1993 the Consorzio Tutela Aceto Balsamico di Modena was born, at the initiative of the largest and oldest manufacturers, for the valorization of the product, its defense, and diffusion worldwide. In 1998 the name was changed to Consorzio Aceto Balsamico di Modena, while keeping the statute unchanged. The consortium mark has been used since January 1999.

The Consorzio Filiera Aceto Balsamico di Modena name adopted in 2010 from the Consorzio Produzione Certificata Aceto Balsamico di Modena brought together some of the biggest producers.

In 2013 those two Consortia joined to form the Consorzio Tutela Aceto Balsamico di Modena.

Lastly, between the enforcement and promotion bodies, there's the Comitato Produttori Indipendenti Aceto Balsamico di Modena, that together with the other two consortia was the promoter of the recognition request of the PGI by the European Union.

Quality check 
The independent certification body is directly nominated by the Ministry of Agricultural, Food and Forestry Policies and it has the task of verifying compliance with the del Disciplinary of Production throughout the production process and the validity of the organoleptic properties of the Balsamic Vinegar before it's put on the market. Each lot intended for bottling (reserved only to authorized and certified centers) must meet the respect of the Disciplinary of Production.

See also 

 Vinegar

References 

Cuisine of Emilia-Romagna
Vinegar
Italian products with protected designation of origin